The 1903 Indiana Hoosiers football team was an American football team that represented Indiana University Bloomington during the 1903 college football season. In their sixth season under head coach James H. Horne, the Hoosiers compiled a 4–4 record and were outscored by their opponents by a combined total of 148 to 124.

Schedule

References

Indiana
Indiana Hoosiers football seasons
Indiana Hoosiers football